Muiris Mac Ionrachtaigh, anglicised as Maurice MacKenraghty (executed 30 April 1585, Clonmel, County Tipperary) was an Irish Roman Catholic priest and one of the Irish Catholic Martyrs. He was beatified in 1992.

Life
Although the exact date of his birth remains unknown, Muiris Mac Ionrachtaigh, was born at Kilmallock, which was "a prosperous walled town in the Desmond lands in County Limerick". His father, Tomás Mac Ionrachtaigh ("Thomas MacKenraghty"), was a goldsmith and silversmith who was originally from the civil barony of Irraghticonnor. The MacKenraghty family were full citizens of the town of Kilmallock and probably also enjoyed the patronage of the Earl of Desmond.

Mac Ionrachtaigh embraced the ecclesiastical state, studied abroad, and graduated bachelor in theology. Returning to Ireland, he became chaplain to Gerald FitzGerald, 15th Earl of Desmond, and shared the fortunes of his patron in the Second Desmond Rebellion against Queen Elizabeth I.

In September, 1583, a fugitive with the Earl, Mac Ionrachtaigh was surprised on Sliabh Luachra by Lord Roche's gallowglass, and handed over to the Earl of Ormond. By Ormond's command he was chained to one Patrick Grant, and sent to prison at Clonmel. Here he lay in irons, instructing and hearing confessions at his prison grate until April 1585.

His jailer was then bribed by Victor White, a leading townsman, to release the priest for one night to say Mass and administer Communion in White's house on Passion Sunday. The jailer secretly tipped off the President of Munster to take this opportunity by apprehending most of the local recusants at Mass.

In the morning an armed force surrounded the house, arrested White and others seized the sacred vessels, and sought the priest everywhere. Fr. Mac Ionrachtaigh had been hidden under straw at the first alarm, and, though wounded when the heap was probed, ultimately escaped to the woods. Learning, however, that White's life could only be saved by his own surrender, he gave himself up, and was at once tried by martial law. Pardon and preferment were offered him for conforming to the Church of Ireland, but he resolutely maintained the Roman Catholic faith and the Petrine Primacy, and was executed as a traitor. His head was displayed spiked in the market-place, and his body, purchased from the soldiers, was buried behind the high altar of the Franciscan convent.

Footnotes

References

Notes

Further reading

 Myles William P. O'Reilly, Memorials of those who Suffered for the Catholic Faith in Ireland (London, 1868) 
Denis Murphy, Our Martyrs (Dublin: Fallon, 1896)
Calendar of State Papers, Ireland, 1574-1585 (London, 1867)
Philip O'Sullevan Bearr, Patriciana Deccas (Madrid, 1629); 
Holding in Spicilegium Ossoriense, Ist ser. (Dublin, 1874)

1585 deaths
16th-century Irish Roman Catholic priests
16th-century Roman Catholic martyrs
16th-century venerated Christians
24 Irish Catholic Martyrs
Irish beatified people
Martyred Roman Catholic priests
People from County Cork
People of the Second Desmond Rebellion
Year of birth unknown
People executed under Elizabeth I as Queen of Ireland